The Human Factor is a Big Finish Productions audio drama based on the long-running British science fiction television series Doctor Who.

Plot 
The Daleks continue their attack on the galaxy.

Cast
Susan Mendes – Sarah Mowatt
Alby Brook – Mark McDonnell
Kalendorf – Gareth Thomas
Pellan – John Wadmore
Narrator – Joyce Gibbs
Admiral Cheviat – Ian Brooker
Ed Byers – Ian Brooker
Roboman – Ian Brooker
Tanlee – David Sax
Dalek Voices – Nicholas BriggsAlistair Lock

External links
Big Finish Productions – The Human Factor

Dalek Empire audio plays
Audio plays by Nicholas Briggs